Aral may refer to:

People
 Cahit Aral (1927–2011), Turkish engineer, politician and former government minister
 Coşkun Aral (born 1956), Turkish photo journalist and war correspondent
 Göran Aral (born 1953), Swedish footballer
 Meriç Aral (born 1988), Turkish actress
 Oğuz Aral (1936–2004), Turkish political cartoonist
 Aral Şimşir (born 2002), Danish footballer

Places

Kyrgyzstan
 Aral, Chuy, a village in Chüy District, Chüy Region
 Aral, Jayyl, a village in Jayyl District, Chüy Region
 Aral, Issyk Kul, a village in Tüp District, Issyk-Kul Region
 Aral, Toktogul District, a village in Toktogul District, Jalal-Abad Region
 Aral, Nooken, a village in Nooken District, Jalal-Abad Region
 Aral, Kara-Darya, a village in Kara-Darya ayyl aymagy, western Suzak District, Jalal-Abad Region
 Aral, Suzak District, a village in Suzak ayyl aymagy, southern Suzak District, Jalal-Abad Region
 Aral, Tash-Bulak, a village in Tash-Bulak ayyl aymagy, central Suzak District, Jalal-Abad Region
 Aral, Toguz-Toro, a village in Toguz-Toro District, Jalal-Abad Region
 Aral, Naryn, a village in Jumgal District, Naryn Region
 Aral, Osh, a village in Nookat District, Osh Region
 Aral, Manas, a village in Manas District, Talas Region
 Aral, Talas, a village in Talas District, Talas Region

Kazakhstan
 Aral, Kazakhstan, a town in Kyzylorda Province
 Aral District, a district of Kyzylorda Province

Other places
 Aral Sea, a lake between Kazakhstan and Uzbekistan
 Aral, Azerbaijan (disambiguation), places in Azerbaijan
 Aral, Xinjiang, People's Republic of China

Other uses
 Aral AG, a gasoline and gas station company in Germany, Luxembourg, and the Czech Republic
 Aral Vorkosigan, father of Miles Vorkosigan in the Vorkosigan Saga science fiction universe

See also
 Aral Formation, a geologic formation in Kazakhstan